Roger Tabor Stewart (born October 4, 1931) is an American politician in the state of Iowa. A Democrat, he served in the Iowa Senate for the 13th district between 2003 and 2011.

Stewart served on several committees in the Iowa Senate: the Commerce committee; the Environment and Energy Independence committee; the Rebuild Iowa committee; the Ways and Means committee; and the Economic Growth committee, where he was the chair.

Stewart was re-elected in 2006 with 12,886 votes (65%), defeating Republican opponent Lametta K. Wynn.

External links
 Senator Roger Stewart official Iowa Legislature site
Senator Roger Stewart official Iowa General Assembly site
State Senator Roger Stewart official constituency site
 

1931 births
Living people
Democratic Party Iowa state senators
Methodists from Iowa
Cornell College alumni
Politicians from Milwaukee
People from Preston, Iowa